Denmark competed at the 2004 Summer Olympics in Athens, Greece, from 13 to 29 August 2004.

Medalists

| width="78%" align="left" valign="top" |

| width="22%" align="left" valign="top" |

Archery 

Denmark has qualified a spot in men's individual archery.

Athletics 

Danish athletes have so far achieved qualifying standards in the following athletics events (up to a maximum of 3 athletes in each event at the 'A' Standard, and 1 at the 'B' Standard). Joachim Olsen originally claimed a bronze medal in men's shot put. On 5 December 2012, the International Olympic Committee and the IAAF stripped off Ukrainian shot putter Yuriy Bilonoh's gold medal after drug re-testings of his samples were discovered positive. Following the announcement of Bilonoh's disqualification, Olsen's medal was upgraded to a silver.

Men
Track & road events

Field events

Women
Track & road events

Field events

Badminton 

Men

Women

Mixed

Canoeing

Sprint

Qualification Legend: Q = Qualify to final; q = Qualify to semifinal

Cycling

Road

Mountain biking

Equestrian

Dressage

Show jumping

Gymnastics

Trampoline

Handball

Women's tournament

Roster

Group play

Quarterfinal

Semifinal

Gold Medal Final

 Won Gold Medal

Rowing

Men

Women

Qualification Legend: FA=Final A (medal); FB=Final B (non-medal); FC=Final C (non-medal); FD=Final D (non-medal); FE=Final E (non-medal); FF=Final F (non-medal); SA/B=Semifinals A/B; SC/D=Semifinals C/D; SE/F=Semifinals E/F; R=Repechage

Sailing

Men

Women

Open

M = Medal race; OCS = On course side of the starting line; DSQ = Disqualified; DNF = Did not finish; DNS= Did not start; RDG = Redress given

Shooting 

Men

Women

Swimming 

Danish swimmers earned qualifying standards in the following events (up to a maximum of 2 swimmers in each event at the A-standard time, and 1 at the B-standard time):

Men

Women

Table tennis

Taekwondo

Triathlon

Denmark has qualified a single triathlete.

Wrestling 

Men's Greco-Roman

See also
 Denmark at the 2004 Summer Paralympics

References

External links
Official Report of the XXVIII Olympiad
DIF.dk 

Nations at the 2004 Summer Olympics
2004
Summer Olympics